Rio Noguchi (born 28 December 1998) is a Japanese tennis player.

Noguchi has a career high ATP singles ranking of 201 achieved on 7 November 2022. He also has a career high ATP doubles ranking of 385 achieved on 2 January 2023.

Career

2022: ATP debut, first win and Top 250
Noguchi made his ATP main draw debut at the 2022 Rakuten Japan Open Tennis Championships after qualifying for the singles main draw, defeating Tatsuma Ito and Yusuke Takahashi to qualify. He won his first ATP and ATP 500 level match defeating fellow qualifier Ramkumar Ramanathan. As a result he climbed 75 positions up the rankings into the top 250.

Singles: 16 (7-9)

Doubles: 16 (6–10)

References

External links

1998 births
Living people
Japanese male tennis players
Sportspeople from Fukuoka Prefecture
21st-century Japanese people